Gypsophila repens, the alpine gypsophila or creeping baby's breath, is a species of flowering plant in the family Caryophyllaceae, native to the mountains of central and southern Europe, where it grows on dry, chalky slopes. The Latin name literally means "creeping chalk-lover". For much of the summer it bears masses of star-shaped flowers which may be white, lilac or light purple, in loose panicles.

In cultivation this plant is often grown in rock gardens or against dry stone walls. Like its relative G. paniculata, it is also used as a cut flower. It has gained the Royal Horticultural Society's Award of Garden Merit.

Gallery

References

 

repens
Plants described in 1753
Taxa named by Carl Linnaeus